Ellina Grigorieva is a Russian mathematician and mathematics educator known for her books on mathematical problem solving. She is a professor in the Texas Woman's University Department of Mathematics and Computer Science, and an expert on control theory and its applications to the spread of disease.

Education and career
Grigorieva was born in Moscow, and educated at Moscow State University.

Books
Grigorieva's problem-solving books include:
Methods of Solving Number Theory Problems (Birkhäuser, 2018)
Methods of Solving Sequence and Series Problems (Birkhäuser, 2016)
Methods of Solving Nonstandard Problems (Birkhäuser, 2015)
Methods of Solving Complex Geometry Problems (Birkhäuser, 2013)

References

Year of birth missing (living people)
Living people
21st-century American mathematicians
Russian mathematicians
American women mathematicians
Moscow State University alumni
Texas Woman's University faculty
21st-century women mathematicians
21st-century American women